The 2016 FIBA Europe SuperCup Women was the sixth edition of the FIBA Europe SuperCup Women. It was held on 20 October 2016 at the Palacium hall in Villeneuve-d'Ascq, France.

Time
Times are CET (UTC+1).

Final

References

External links
 SuperCup Women

2016
2016–17 in European women's basketball
2016–17 in French basketball
2016–17 in Russian basketball
International women's basketball competitions hosted by France